Wise men or wise man may refer to:
 Biblical Magi, who follow the Star of Bethlehem in the New Testament
 Sage (philosophy), a person who attained wisdom
 Sanxing (deities), personified deities of good fortune, prosperity, and longevity in Chinese Buddhism and Taoism
 The Wise Men (book), 1986 book about American foreign policy elders during the Cold War
Wise Men (Nadler novel), 2013 novel by Stuart Nadler
 Wise Men of Gotham, early name for the people of Gotham, Nottinghamshire
 Wisemen (rap group), American hip-hop collective
 "Wisemen", 2005 pop rock song by Thelma Perez and Mark Anthony Rubion XB

See also
Three Wise Men (disambiguation)
Wise guy (disambiguation)
Wiseman (disambiguation)